Thomas Robert Zinkula (born April 19, 1957) is an American prelate of the Roman Catholic Church in the United States.  Zinkula was a priest in the Archdiocese of Dubuque in Iowa until he was named the ninth bishop of Davenport in Iowa in 2017.

Biography

Early life and education
Thomas Zinkula was born on April 19, 1957, in Mount Vernon, Iowa to Robert and Mary (Volz) Zinkula.  He grew up on a farm with eight siblings. In 1975, Zinkula graduated as the valedictorian from Mount Vernon High School.  He received a bachelor's degree in mathematics, economics and business from Cornell College in Mount Vernon.  Zinkula was later inducted into the Athletic Hall of Fame at Cornell as a defensive lineman for football.

After college, Zinkula worked for one year as an actuary for Life Investors in Cedar Rapids, Iowa.  Zinkula then entered the University of Iowa College of Law in Iowa City, Iowa, earning a Juris Doctor in 1983.  He practiced law for three years with the Simmons, Perrine, Albright & Ellwood law firm in Cedar Rapids, Iowa.

Zinkula studied for the priesthood at Theological College at the Catholic University of America in Washington, D.C., receiving a Master in Theology degree in 1990.  He earned a Licentiate in Canon Law from Saint Paul University in 1998. Remarking on his decision to enter the priesthood, Zinkula stated:"For me, that was the path. It was important for me to find my way to the priesthood eventually. I would not have been ready to be a priest right out of college. I needed to grow and develop in different ways. I look back and see my life was preparing me to be a priest and the priesthood was preparing me to be a better bishop. All of those things helped me to serve the Church better."

Priesthood
Zinkula was ordained a priest for the Archdiocese of Dubuque by Archbishop Daniel Kucera on May 26, 1990, at St. Raphael's Cathedral in Dubuque.  He served as the assistant pastor of St. Columbkille's Parish in Dubuque from 1990 to 1993 and as the assistant pastor at St. Joseph the Worker Parish in Dubuque from 1993 to 1996.

After studying canon law, Zinkula became the pastor of St. Joseph Parish in Rickardsville, Iowa and sacramental priest for St. Francis Parish in Balltown, Iowa and Saints Peter and Paul Parish in Sherill, Iowa (1998 to 2002).  Zinkula  served as a judge at the Archdiocesan Tribunal from 1998 to 2000 and as judicial vicar from 2000 to 2010.  He was named pastor of Holy Ghost Parish in Dubuque, and served from 2005 to 2007.  Holy Ghost was clustered with Sacred Heart and Holy Trinity parishes to form the Holy Spirit Pastorate, which he served as pastor from 2007 to 2011. Zinkula served as the episcopal vicar for the Cedar Rapids, Iowa region of the archdiocese from 2012 to 2014, and as the rector of St. Pius X Seminary in Dubuque from 2014 to 2017.  Zinkula was named a monsignor by Pope Benedict XVI in 2012.

Bishop of Davenport
On April 19, 2017 Pope Francis named Zinkula as the ninth bishop of the Diocese of Davenport.  When initially notified of his appointment by text message, Zinkula assumed it a prank from one of the seminarians. Zinkula was ordained a bishop at St. John Vianney Church in Bettendorf, Iowa by Archbishop Michael Jackels of Dubuque, with Bishop Martin Amos and Archbishop Jerome Hanus as co-consecrators.

On June 3, 2019, Zinkula indicated that the diocese would comply with a request from the Iowa Attorney General for sexual abuses records on clerics in the diocese. On August 16, 2018, Zinkula made the following statement about sexual abuse by priests:“The abuse of children and vulnerable adults isn’t an issue that will simply go away. We must all be constantly vigilant in order to protect those who cannot protect themselves.”

See also

 Catholic Church hierarchy
 Catholic Church in the United States
 Historical list of the Catholic bishops of the United States
 List of Catholic bishops of the United States
 Lists of patriarchs, archbishops, and bishops

References

Episcopal succession

 

1957 births
Living people
People from Mount Vernon, Iowa
Cornell College alumni
University of Iowa College of Law alumni
Catholic University of America alumni
Saint Paul University alumni
Roman Catholic Archdiocese of Dubuque
Roman Catholic bishops of Davenport
21st-century Roman Catholic bishops in the United States
Bishops appointed by Pope Francis